Green's Farm (Huntley), also known as Roselawn, is a historic estate located in Richmond, Virginia. The original section of the main house was built between 1843 and 1846, and is a two-story, three bay, brick dwelling with a slate-covered hipped roof.  It has additions built in 1906 and about 1977.  Also on the property are the contributing kitchen (c. 1846), well house (c. 1846), and ice house.  During the American Civil War, the original portion of the house was used as a field hospital and saw some action in March 1864 during Dahlgren's Raid.

It was added to the National Register of Historic Places in 2005.

References

Houses on the National Register of Historic Places in Virginia
Houses completed in 1846
Houses in Richmond, Virginia
National Register of Historic Places in Richmond, Virginia